ELSO may refer to:

 European Life Scientist Organization
 A tradename for S-Amlodipine
 Extracorporeal Life Support Organization